Graceful wattle is a common name for several plants and may refer to:

Acacia decora, native to eastern Australia
Acacia gracilifolia